Victor Alexander Craig (27 July 1917 in Strabane, County Tyrone – 28 June 2005 in Strabane) was an Irish cricketer. A left-handed batsman and wicket-keeper, he played just once for the Ireland cricket team, a first-class match against the MCC in Dublin in August 1948.

References

1917 births
2005 deaths
Irish cricketers
People from Strabane
Cricketers from Northern Ireland
Wicket-keepers